Bianca Fallon Mann (born 21 February 1995) is a retired South African gymnast. She competed for South Africa at the 2014 Commonwealth Games where she finished 20th in the all-around final and 6th in the team final. Additionally, she competed at the World Championships in 2014 and 2015. At the 2014 World Championships, she competed in the all-around to help the South African team finish 33rd. At the 2015 World Championships, she scored 49.432 in the all-around and finished 109th. She is the 2015 South African National Champion in the all-around and on the uneven bars, and she also won silver on vault and bronze on balance beam and floor exercise. At the 2015 Doha World Cup, she finished 6th on the uneven bars with a score of 12.625, and at the 2015 Ljubljana World Cup she finished 5th on the uneven bars with a score of 11.425. She also is the 2016 South African National Champion in the all-around and on the uneven bars, and she also won silver on balance beam and floor exercise. Her last major competition was the 2017 Summer Universiade where she finished 11th with the team and 28th in the all-around.

References 

1995 births
Living people
South African female artistic gymnasts
Sportspeople from Johannesburg
Gymnasts at the 2014 Commonwealth Games
Commonwealth Games competitors for South Africa
Competitors at the 2017 Summer Universiade